In Old California is a 1929 American silent Western film directed by Burton L. King and starring Tom Keene, Helen Ferguson and Henry B. Walthall.

Cast
 Tom Keene as Lt. Tony Hopkins 
 Helen Ferguson as Dolores Radanell
 Henry B. Walthall as Don Pedro De León
 Carlotta Monti as Juanita 
 Ray Hallor as Pedro DeLeón
 Orral Humphrey as Ike Boone
 Larry Steers as Ollie Radanell
 Richard Carlyle as Arturo
 Harry Allen as Sgt. Washburn
 Louis Stern as Ramón De Hermosa
 Paul Ellis as José
 Gertrude Chorre as Indian Servant

References

Bibliography
 Roy Liebman. From Silents to Sound: A Biographical Encyclopedia of Performers who Made the Transition to Talking Pictures. McFarland, 1998.

External links
 

1929 films
1929 adventure films
1929 Western (genre) films
1920s English-language films
Silent American Western (genre) films
American adventure films
Films directed by Burton L. King
American black-and-white films
Silent adventure films
1920s American films